Ockert Jacobus Jacques du Toit (born 19 November 1993) is a South African professional rugby union player for Zebre Parma in the United Rugby Championship, and previously for Bath in Premiership Rugby. His regular position is hooker.

Career

Youth / Varsity Cup / Vodacom Cup

In 2011, Du Toit was selected to represent Free State at the premier South African high school rugby union competition, the Under-18 Craven Week tournament held in Kimberley, where he started two matches for a Free State side that was crowned unofficial champions at the tournament, beating the Golden Lions 28–17 in the main match.

After high school, Du Toit joined the Free State Cheetahs Academy at the University of the Free State and was the first-choice hooker for the  side during the 2012 Under-19 Provincial Championship, starting ten of their matches and scoring a try in their match against the s.

In 2012, Du Toit was selected in the  squad for the 2012 Varsity Cup, making a single appearance in their match against .

Du Toit was then selected in the South African Under-20 squad for the 2013 IRB Junior World Championship in France, which attempted to retain the title they won in 2012. They started in fine fashion, beating the United States 97–0 in the opening match, with Du Toit starting the match and scoring one of South Africa's 16 tries just before half-time. He also started their 31–24 win over England and their 26–19 win over the hosts France in their other pool matches. Du Toit retained his starting berth for their semi-final match against Wales, where South Africa suffered a 17–18 loss to be eliminated from the competition. Their final match in the competition was a third-place play-off against New Zealand; Du Toit played off the bench in this match, helping South Africa finish in third spot in the tournament by winning the match 41–34.

Du Toit returned to domestic action for the s, playing in all twelve of their matches during the 2013 Under-21 Provincial Championship. He also scored a try in their match against the s as the Free State finished in fifth spot on the log.

They finished fifth, just missing out on a semi-final berth. He was also drafted into the  squad for the 2014 Vodacom Cup. He started eleven times in the s' 2014 Under-21 Provincial Championship season, helping them finish in fourth spot on the log to qualify for the semi-finals, where they lost to the table-topping s.

He played in their final two matches of the round-robin phase of the competition, helping Shimlas finish in second spot on the log. He again moved to the  Vodacom Cup squad at the conclusion of the Varsity Cup and made four appearances for them. This included his first start in a first class match in their 29–30 defeat to eventual finalists .

Free State Cheetahs

From 2015 to 2019, Du Toit made regular appearances in both the Super Rugby and Pro14 leagues as hooker. He played in both the 2016 and 2019 Currie Cup finals, both of which the Cheetahs won. After 5 seasons at the Free State Cheetahs, he joins the Southern Kings in Port Elizabeth, South Africa as the starting hooker.

Southern Kings 
Jacques du Toit joins the Southern Kings in 2019 after they experienced a rocky Pro14 2020-19 season. After just a few months, du Toit discussions emerge that he will be announced as the Southern Kings 2020-21 captain. These plans are however hindered because of the global COVID-19 pandemic and soon after, the Southern Kings go into voluntary liquidation.

Bath Rugby 
Following his time in South Africa, du Toit signed with English Premiership Rugby side Bath with immediate effect in January 2021.
He was initially called to join the club as injury cover for 6 months during the 2020/21 season, but his contract was soon extended to the 2021/22 Gallagher Premiership season too. After being carried off the field in May and sustaining what seemed to be a serious ankle injury, du Toit made a miraculous recovery and was on the field again the following week. He has played an astonishing 762 minutes in 20 appearances during the 2021/22 season, making him one of the most regular faces in the Premiership league to date.

References

South African rugby union players
Living people
1993 births
Rugby union players from Bloemfontein
Rugby union hookers
Free State Cheetahs players
South Africa Under-20 international rugby union players
Cheetahs (rugby union) players
Southern Kings players
Bath Rugby players
Zebre Parma players